Caloptilia verecunda is a moth of the family Gracillariidae. It is known from Namibia.

References

Endemic fauna of Namibia
verecunda
Insects of Namibia
Moths of Africa
Moths described in 2004